Jan Hála (born 3 June 1996) is a professional Czech football midfielder currently playing for SK České Budějovice.

He made his league debut on 7 March 2014 in a 2-2 Czech National Football League home win against Slovan Varnsdorf. He scored his first league goal on 4 April 2012 in a 1-0 home win against Loko Vltavín.

References
 Jan Hála international statistics
 

Czech footballers
Czech Republic youth international footballers
Czech Republic under-21 international footballers
1996 births
Living people
SK Dynamo České Budějovice players
Association football midfielders
Sportspeople from České Budějovice